The 2020 U Sports Women's Ice Hockey Championship was scheduled to be held March 12–15, 2020, in Charlottetown, Prince Edward Island, to determine a national champion for the 2019–20 U Sports women's ice hockey season. The tournament was cancelled after two semi-final games had been played due to the COVID-19 pandemic. Despite the cancellation, the 2020 U SPORTS women’s hockey championship was named the SCORE! Event of the Year by PEI Amateur Sport.

The entire tournament was to be played at MacLauchlan Arena on the campus of the University of Prince Edward Island. It was the second consecutive year that the tournament was to be hosted by UPEI as well as their second time hosting overall.

Participating teams

Championship Bracket

Consolation Bracket

See also 
2020 U Sports University Cup

References

External links 
 Tournament Web Site

U Sports women's ice hockey
Ice hockey in Prince Edward Island
2019–20 in Canadian ice hockey
Sport in Charlottetown